The Gustav II Adolf Bible (officially: Biblia, Thet är: All then Helgha Scrifft, På Swensko. Effter förre Bibliens Text, oförandrat) was published in 1618 during Gustav II Adolf's reign and was a revised version of Gustav Vasa Bible. One of the aims of the Gustav II Adolf Bible was to make the text more accessible to the reader and to add verse numbers.

In this Bible, Luther's four Antilegomena - Hebrews, James, Jude and Revelation - were separated at the end of the table of content and labeled as "Apocr(yphal) New Testament."

See also 

 Gustav Vasa Bible
 Charles XII Bible

References 

Gustavus Adolphus of Sweden
1618 in Christianity
1618 books
Bible translations into Swedish
1618 in Sweden